By the Treaty of Compiègne in August 867, King Charles the Bald ceded the peninsula of Cotentin to King Salomon of Brittany. Though not specified in the treaty, the Avranchin, including Mont Saint-Michel, was likely included in the concession.

See also
Treaty of Compiègne (1624)

Treaties of the Duchy of Normandy
9th-century treaties